Josh Lewin is an American sportscaster who works as a play-by-play announcer for the UCLA Bruins football and basketball teams.

Early life and career

Lewin is originally from Rochester, New York, but lived outside of Boston for several years as a young boy. As early as nursery school, he was an avid sports fan. He graduated from Northwestern University, where he was a member of the Lambda Chi Alpha fraternity, in 1990.

Broadcasting career

Minor league baseball

Lewin got his start in broadcasting as the radio commentator for the Rochester Red Wings, then the Triple-A affiliate of the Baltimore Orioles, at the age of 16, and became the team's regular play-by-play announcer in 1991. With the Red Wings, Lewin was a member of a staff that included Joe Altobelli, Russ Brandon, Glenn Geffner, Joe Kehoskie, and Bob Socci.

Major League Baseball
In 1994 Lewin became the host of the sports call-in show Sports Line on WBAL radio in Baltimore. After filling in on Baltimore Orioles radio broadcasts during the 1995 and 1996 seasons, Lewin joined the Chicago Cubs' television broadcasting team on WGN in 1997, before moving on to the Detroit Tigers' TV booth from 1998 to 2001 on Fox Sports Detroit. In 2000, he was the first-ever recipient of the Ty Tyson Award for Excellence in Sports Broadcasting, awarded by the Detroit Sports Broadcasters Association. Lewin was the TV voice for the Texas Rangers from 2002 through 2011, usually on Fox Sports Southwest but also on local broadcasts for KDFI, KDFW and TXA 21. The Rangers organization announced on October 11, 2011, that Lewin would not be returning as play-by-play announcer for the team. On February 9, 2012, it was announced that Lewin would be joining the New York Mets Radio Network, succeeding Wayne Hagin. He shared play-by-play duties with Howie Rose on Mets broadcasts. Lewin left his position with the Mets following the 2018 season. During the 2019 MLB season, Lewin served as a part-time play-by-play announcer for Boston Red Sox Radio Network broadcasts alongside Joe Castiglione.

Lewin was one of the original play-by-play commentators for Fox Major League Baseball, calling regular season regional games from 1996 to 2011. He started on the fourth regional crew calling games, but by 1999 was promoted to the number three booth where he would remain from 1999 to 2011. He would often fill in for principal play-by-play men Joe Buck (with Tim McCarver during the regular season) or Thom Brennaman (with Steve Lyons during the postseason). Lewin left Fox Sports after his contract with Fox Sports Southwest was not renewed.

National Football League
During football seasons past, Lewin served as both a sideline reporter and play-by-play man for Fox NFL and called NFL games for SportsUSA/Jones Radio. From 2005 to 2016, he was the radio voice of the San Diego Chargers (he left after the team's move to Los Angeles at the end of the 2016 season). On August 26, 2006, Lewin provided television play-by-play for Fox Sports' Fox Saturday Baseball game of the week between the New York Yankees and Los Angeles Angels of Anaheim. That game took place at Angel Stadium of Anaheim. When the game was over, he traveled 90 miles down to Qualcomm Stadium in San Diego to provide radio play-by-play coverage of the San Diego Chargers' NFL preseason game against the Seattle Seahawks for the Chargers Radio Network. The two games announced in one day was similar to Ted Leitner's time as announcer for both the Chargers and the San Diego Padres when he would broadcast a Chargers game then travel to join the Padres broadcast late in the baseball season.

National Hockey League
Lewin has also subbed in as the Dallas Stars play-by-play man when Dallas's usual lead voice, Ralph Strangis, was recovering from a car accident in 2003. He also did play-by-play for Fox NHL Saturday in 1998 and FSN Detroit's coverage of CCHA hockey.

The Josh and Elf Show
On October 29, 2010, it was announced that Lewin would be moving to 105.3 The Fan to host a new show in their 11am–2pm time slot. The new show started on November 1, 2010, with Greg Williams and Richie Witt moving their show to the 2pm–7pm slot. On Monday, November 29, 2010, it was announced Mark "Elf" Elfenbein would be joining the show now named The Josh and Elf Show. Following Lewin's hiring by the New York Mets and departure from The Fan, Elf and friends was launched. Numerous personalities tried out to fill Lewin's spot. He would eventually be replaced by Jane Slater, making it The Elf and Slater Show.

College football
Lewin is employed by the Big Ten Network calling football games. He also has called Conference USA football on Sports USA as well. On June 2, 2016, he was hired to be the play-by-play announcer for the UCLA Bruins football team.

College basketball
Lewin also calls collegiate basketball for UCLA, along with former Bruin standout Tracy Murray. Lewin has made other appearances on Sports USA, Fox Sports Networks, the SMU Mustangs and Michigan State Spartans.

XFL
In 2023 Lewin began hosting the XFL's official podcast called XFL Week in Review.

References

External links
 Official Broadcaster Bio on KIOZ 105.3 Website (Official Chargers Radio Station)
 Article "MLB and NFL Announcer Josh Lewin"
 

Living people
American radio sports announcers
American television sports announcers
Baltimore Orioles announcers
Boston Red Sox announcers
Chicago Cubs announcers
College basketball announcers in the United States
College football announcers
College hockey announcers in the United States
Dallas Stars announcers
Detroit Tigers announcers
Major League Baseball broadcasters
Minor League Baseball broadcasters
National Football League announcers
National Hockey League broadcasters
New York Mets announcers
Northwestern University alumni
San Diego Chargers announcers
San Diego Padres announcers
Sportspeople from Rochester, New York
Texas Rangers (baseball) announcers
UCLA Bruins football announcers
Year of birth missing (living people)